Ben Ali (1883 - c.1903) was the winner of the 1886 Kentucky Derby and was named after his owner, James Ben Ali Haggin, a man of Turkish heritage who had struck gold in the California Gold Rush of 1849. Ben Ali was foaled in Kentucky and was a large bay colt sired by Virgil. His damsire was the great Lexington, a major foundation sire of American thoroughbreds. Ben Ali is best known for his Derby win and a wagering snafu that ushered in a bad era for the Kentucky Derby.1

Wagering monopoly and boycott
In 1886, C. M. White purchased the pooling privileges (wagering rights) for the Kentucky Derby for $30,600 and demanded that all the Derby bookmakers pay him a $100 licensing fee to operate at the track.1 The bookmakers refused and, as a consequence, there were no bookies at the 1886 Derby to handle high-dollar bets. Haggin could not place a large bet on his winning stallion and was so upset that he threatened to bar his entire stable from ever racing in another Kentucky Derby unless bookmakers were reinstated at the track.1 The track director refused Haggin's demands, replying, "To hell with him anyway"1, enraging Haggin and causing him to shun the Derby.1 News traveled in the East Coast horse racing circuits of Haggin's treatment in Louisville, causing many Eastern horsemen to boycott the Kentucky Derby during the 1890s and early 20th century.1 Bookmakers returned for the 1887 Derby, but the field quality and race profits dropped dramatically over the years until Churchill Downs was facing closure in 1903. Churchill Downs was sold to a syndicate led by Matt Winn in 1903.

Ben Ali is reported to have died at around 20 years of age (c. 1903) at Haggin's Rancho del Paso stud in California.

Pedigree

References

1883 racehorse births
Racehorses trained in the United States
Racehorses bred in Kentucky
Kentucky Derby winners
Thoroughbred family 11
Byerley Turk sire line